Ostholstein – Stormarn-Nord is an electoral constituency (German: Wahlkreis) represented in the Bundestag. It elects one member via first-past-the-post voting. Under the current constituency numbering system, it is designated as constituency 9. It is located in eastern Schleswig-Holstein, comprising the Ostholstein district and northeastern parts of the Stormarn district.

Ostholstein – Stormarn-Nord was created for the 1976 federal election. Since 2021, it has been represented by Bettina Hagedorn of the Social Democratic Party (SPD).

Geography
Ostholstein – Stormarn-Nord is located in eastern Schleswig-Holstein. As of the 2021 federal election, it comprises the entirety of the Ostholstein district, and the municipality of Reinfeld and Amt of Nordstormarn from the Stormarn district.

History
Ostholstein – Stormarn-Nord was created in 1976, then known as Ostholstein. It contained parts of the abolished constituencies of Plön and Segeberg – Eutin. Originally, it was coterminous with the Ostholstein district. In the 1998 election, the municipality of Reinfeld and Amt of Nordstormarn were transferred from Segeberg – Stormarn-Nord to Ostholstein. The constituency acquired its current name in the 2013 election.

Members
The constituency was held by the Christian Democratic Union (CDU) from its creation in 1976 until 1980, during which time it was represented by Karl Carstens, who resigned in 1979 to become President of the Federal Republic. The constituency was won by the Social Democratic Party (SPD) in 1980, and represented by Günther Jansen for a single term. Rolf Olderog regained it for the CDU in 1983, and served as its member until 1998. From 1998 to 2009, it was held by the SPD, during which time it was represented by Antje-Marie Steen until 2002, and then Bettina Hagedorn. Ingo Gädechens of the CDU was elected in 2009, and re-elected in 2013 and 2017. Former member Hagedorn regained the constituency for the SPD in 2021.

Election results

2021 election

2017 election

2013 election

2009 election

References

Federal electoral districts in Schleswig-Holstein
1976 establishments in West Germany
Constituencies established in 1976